(shortly known as Chappy) is an anime series that debuted in TV Asahi (then known as NET, or Nihon Educational Television) in 1972. It is the fifth magical girl anime in history (the sixth if one counts Osamu Tezuka's Marvelous Melmo), and the fifth produced by the Toei Animation studio. While the show was fairly popular, it was not as popular as Toei's earlier magical-girl series, and is relatively obscure compared to its predecessors.

In addition to its success in Japan, Chappy has been dubbed into Italian, French and Spanish and broadcast on TV in Italy and various Latin American nations such as Mexico, Peru, Chile and Guatemala.  The French dub, made in the early 1990s by AB Productions, was never aired, possibly due to lukewarm reception for earlier majokko series of the same vintage (such as Mahou no Mako-chan and Majokko Megu-chan) on French television.

A manga adaptation of the story was drawn by Hideo Azuma, who later created his own magical girl series, Nanako SOS, in 1983.

Chappy, along with other Toei's magical girls such as Akko-chan, Sally, Cutie Honey, Megu-chan, Lunlun, and Lalabel, is a playable character in the 1999 Sony PlayStation game Majokko Daisakusen: Little Witching Mischiefs.

The series was released in a box set in Japan on DVD by ICF Co., Ltd. in December 2005.

Plot 
Chappy's story is much like Sally's of Sally the Witch.  Chappy, becoming sick of the old customs of her people, left the Land of Magic for the human world. Soon her family sees how much she has in the other realm that they decide to join her in new home. Chappy is known for being the first witch to use a wand (actually a magical baton, given to her by her grandfather). Her special chant is "Abura Mahariku Maharita Kabura". Chappy's closest human friends are tomboy Michiko and girly-girl Shizuko, much like her predecessor Sally's friends Yotchan and Sumire.

In a nod to the ecological concerns of the early 1970s, the series featured one noteworthy episode late in the show's run, written by Shukei Nagasaka, which dealt with issues such as pollution and use of natural resources. The show is also notable for featuring several Disney references, including a reference to the 1959 film Sleeping Beauty in one episode, and for the panda mascot character, Don-chan, introduced to cash in on a panda mini-craze in 1972 Japan (which also informed Hayao Miyazaki's Panda! Go Panda!).

Cast 
 Eiko Masuyama as Chappy Hans Charles Grimm and Aesop Et Cetera
 Sachiko Chijimatsu as Jun Hans Charles Grimm and Aesop Et Cetera
 Kouji Yada as Mr. Hans Charles Grimm and Aesop Et Cetera
 Noriko Watanabe as Mrs. Hans Charles Grimm and Aesop Et Cetera, Shizuko
 Kousei Tomita as Don, Grandpa
 Nobuyo Tsuda as Obaba
 Ogushi Yoko as Michiko
 Masako Nozawa as Ipei
 Sumiko Shirakawa as Nihei

Characters 
 Chappy: A little witch who becomes bored of the Magic World, and escapes to Earth. She uses magic with her grandfather's baton.
 Jun: Chappy's little brother. He is able to transform into different animals. He always wants to ride Don-chan's magical car.
 Don: A talking red panda who rides around in a magical car.
 Mr. and Mrs. Hans Charles Grimm and Aesop Et Cetera: Chappy and Jun's parents. They decide to live in the human world.
 Grandpa: Chappy and Jun's grandfather. He is constantly yelling at his son. He cares deeply for Chappy.
 Obaba: The oldest witch. She is a type of guardian to Chappy's family, but has no blood relation to them.
 Michiko: Chappy's first friend on Earth. A hot-headed tomboy, she keeps her two little brothers in line. Her father owns a dry cleaning business.
 Ipei and Nihei: Michiko's two little brothers. They are both trouble makers, and are close with Jun.
 Shizuko: The local girly-girl. She is one of Chappy's classmates, and close friends.

Episode list (original work)

Music

Theme written by Keiko Osonoe and music composed by Hiroshi Tsutsui

Anime staff
 Planning: Takashi Iijima, Shinichi Miyazaki (NET)
 Production Supervisor: Masaharu Eto
 Episode Direction: Yugo Serikawa, Mineo Kachita, Hiroshi Ikeda, Katsutoshi Sasaki, Masayuki Akihi, Osamu Kasai, Yoshihiro Kaneko, Tsunekiyo Otani, Takashi Kuoka, Hiromi Yamamoto, Tomoharu Katsumata, Kiyoshi Tanaka, Bondo Eiju, Minoru Okazaki, Nobuo Onuki, Hideo Furusawa, Kazuya Miyazaki 
 Script: Masaki Tsuji, Saburo Taki, Shunichi Yukimuro, Noboru Shiroyama, Jiro Yoshino, Kuniaki Oshikawa, Koji Natsume, Shukei Nagasaka 
 Animation Direction: Shinya Takahashi, Takao Hanata, Bondo Eiju, Shingo Araki, Katsuya Oda, Teruo Hosoda, Takashi Abe, Teruo Kogure, Takao Kozai, Eiji Uemura, Minoru Tajima, Hideo Furusawa, Fumio Eto 
 Art Director: Makoto Yamazaki, Saburo Yokoi, Eiji Ito, Mataharu Urata, Shigeyoshi Endo
 Music: Hiroshi Tsutsui

References

External links 
 
 Chappy at Toei Animation
 

1972 anime television series debuts
Hideo Azuma
Witchcraft in television
Magical girl anime and manga
Toei Animation television
TV Asahi original programming